Perrancoombe is a hamlet near Perranzabuloe in Cornwall, England. The name Perrancoombe comes from the Cornish language words Peran or Saint Piran, and komm, meaning 'small valley' or 'dingle'.

References

Hamlets in Cornwall